Wesley Karl Duncan (born December 26, 1980) is a Nevada attorney, member of the Air Force reserve, and prosecutor. He served as First Assistant Attorney General of Nevada  from 2014 to September 2017 and as a Republican member of the Nevada Assembly from 2013 to 2014. In 2018, Duncan ran to be the Attorney General of Nevada, losing to Nevada Senate Democratic Leader Aaron Ford. Duncan was employed as a Washoe County Deputy District Attorney until October 2020.  In October 2020, Duncan became the Chief Assistant City Attorney in Sparks and on April 25, 2022, was named as the 17th City Attorney in the history of Sparks, Nevada, after the retirment of Chet Adams.  In his role as City Attorney, Duncan has championed the cause of eliminating domestic violence and protecting children in the City of Sparks.

Early life and education 
Duncan was born on December 26, 1980, in Sonora, California. His father was a 42-year employee of the United Parcel Service. His mother was a teacher's assistant at his high school.

After high school, Duncan stayed home to attend community college while earning an AA from Columbia College. He later transferred to University of California, Berkeley, where he earned his bachelor's degree.

Duncan attended the Ohio State University, Moritz College of Law, where he received his law degree.

Career
After graduating from law school, Duncan was commissioned as an officer in the United States Air Force. While serving on active duty, he deployed to Iraq in support of Operation Iraqi Freedom and worked at the Central Criminal Court of Iraq. After four and a half years of active duty service, Duncan entered the Air Force Reserves. He currently serves with the 940th Air Refueling Wing and holds the rank of Lieutenant Colonel.  Mr. Duncan has served as a prosecutor, State Assemblyman, partner in private practice and municipal lawyer.

Nevada First Assistant Attorney General

Reproductive choice 
 
During Duncan’s tenure, the Attorney General’s office signed Nevada onto at least two known lawsuits supporting abortion restrictions or pro-life entities in other states, including lawsuits supporting an Alabama ban on the most commonly used second-trimester abortion procedure. In the Supreme Court case Whole Woman’s Health v. Hellerstedt, the office signed Nevada onto an amicus brief in support of a Texas TRAP law that imposed medically unnecessary restrictions on abortion clinics in order to curb the availability of abortion providers. The Supreme Court found the restrictions were an unconstitutional violation of the prohibition on placing an “undue burden” on the right to obtain an abortion.
 
The Duncan-era Attorney General’s office sent a letter to Nevada Planned Parenthood facilities questioning their abortion services and asking if they donated fetal tissue, part of a wave of investigations into videos which fueled a threat to cut funding to Planned Parenthood. A U.S. District Judge issued a restraining order blocking further publication of the illicitly recorded footage, which he called “misleadingly edited videos and unfounded assertions of criminal conduct.” In December 2015, the Attorney’s General office closed the inquiry, confirming the facilities do not perform surgical abortions or participate in fetal tissue donation programs. On September 7, 2017, Duncan’s last day as First Assistant Attorney General, the office signed Nevada onto a lawsuit urging the U.S. Supreme Court to allow the release of the videos made by the anti-abortion group, whose leaders were facing felony charges in California for recording people without permission. The Supreme Court declined to take up appeals by the abortion opponents and left in place the lower court’s ruling.

Immigrant families 
 
In Duncan’s first month in office as First Assistant Attorney General, the office announced it would challenge President Barack Obama's order to shield millions from deportation and allow them to apply for work permits. Republican Governor Brian Sandoval distanced himself from the challenge by the Attorney General's Office. Sandoval said that he did not think he could legally override the challenge, to which he did not consent, and that he planned to talk with the Attorney General about it.

Elections
Duncan was unopposed for the 2012 Republican Primary for the 37th District. In the general election, he faced Democratic Assemblyman Marcus Conklin, who was serving as Majority Leader of the Nevada Assembly. On November 6, Duncan defeated Conklin with 14,969 votes (51.5%). Duncan was named Freshman Legislator of the year for the Assembly by the Las Vegas Review Journal.

In 2014, Duncan won reelection as District 37 Assemblyman with 61.4%.  However, he resigned his seat on December 4, after accepting an appointment to the position of First Assistant Attorney General.

On November 2, 2017, Duncan announced his campaign for Attorney General of Nevada. He won the Republican nomination and lost the November general election to Democrat Aaron D. Ford by less than .50%.

Duncan will face a retention election in 2024 for his position as the Sparks City Attorney.

2018 Attorney General's race

Endorsements

Attorney General Adam Laxalt 
Duncan was endorsed by Attorney General Adam Laxalt, under whom he worked from 2014 to 2017, who said “Our next Attorney General must be ready, willing and able to serve you on day one to ensure your constitutional rights and your communities are protected. That is why I’m supporting Wes Duncan for Attorney General. Nevada Law Enforcement has made their voices heard and are standing squarely with Wes and I am proud to do so as well.”

Nevada Sheriffs 
17 Nevada sheriffs endorsed Duncan’s campaign for Attorney General.

Storey County Sheriff Gerald Antinoro 
Storey County Sheriff Gerald Antinoro was accused of rape in 2014. A 2016 independent investigation found that Antinoro sexually harassed his top deputy. Storey County Administrator Austin Osborne said in a deposition that “numerous…more than 10” complaints including sexual harassment allegations were filed against Antinoro. After the sexual harassment investigation, Antinoro faced a recall election. Wes Duncan was endorsed by Antinoro in November 2017 after he announced his candidacy. Duncan publicized a campaign meeting with Antinoro in March 2018. In April 2018, Tahoe-Reno Industrial Center called on the Nevada Attorney General to rescind the endorsement he received from Antinoro and to investigate multiple allegations of sexual harassment against Antinoro. Duncan faced scrutiny for refusing to disavow Antinoro’s support. Duncan did not respond to questions about Antinoro’s support for his campaign. 

In May 2018, Duncan dismissed criticism of his refusal to reject the endorsement or denounce Antinoro as “purely political.” At the end of May, Duncan was scheduled to campaign with Antinoro but Antinoro announced he would not attend after the event was picked up in media. In June 2018, Duncan said the Attorney General’s office had an ongoing criminal investigation of Antinoro’s alleged sexual misconduct and that if he won the office and the investigation was still ongoing, anything he said about it would immediately be seized upon as bias by Antinoro supporters. 

Three days before the investigation results were released, Duncan’s campaign manager released a statement saying Duncan would not campaign with Antinoro, did not want his endorsement and had removed the endorsement from Duncan’s campaign website. On July 9th 2018, the Attorney General’s office released the long-awaited investigative report into Antinoro and announced that it would not pursue criminal charges. An October 2018 letter showed that the Attorney’s General office met with former deputy sheriff Melanie Keener in early 2016, at which time the deputy shared details of Antinoro’s history of sexually harassing employees.

National Rifle Association 
The National Rifle Association endorsed Duncan and gave him an A+ rating.

Republican Governor Brian Sandoval's decision not to endorse 
Nevada Governor Brian Sandoval, a Republican, announced he would not take a position in the race for Attorney General, saying Duncan was “a hardworking person that I was impressed with” and, of his opponent, that “I worked with Sen. Ford, and my experience with him has been very positive. He’s a very committed public servant.”

Fundraising

Contributions received 
Duncan received contributions from billionaire casino owner Sheldon Adelson, the NRA and the Fertitta brothers.

Controversy over fundraising as a state employee 
Duncan made a point on the campaign trail to say that he left the attorney general’s office because he didn’t want to run for public office as a state employee. But prior to leaving his job in the attorney general’s office in September 2017, campaign finance reports showed Duncan had raised some $190,000 over the first eight months of 2017 while still working as a state employee. Duncan said he regarded his campaign fundraising as a second job and chose to leave his official position in September 2017 because it was getting to the point where he “could not have done both jobs well.” Duncan's Republican primary opponent, attorney Craig Mueller, filed a racketeering lawsuit alleging Duncan “solicited campaign contributions from the very businesses which he held regulatory and/or disciplinary authority over” when he collected $190,000 from businesses and entities including Station Casinos, Resort World Las Vegas, Nevada Power Company and Comcast Corporation. From January 2017 to August, Duncan and his campaign committee “agreed to and did in fact conduct and participate in the conduct of the enterprise’s affairs through a pattern of continuous and related racketeering activity in a closed-ended scheme,” Mueller’s complaint stated.

Personal life 
Duncan lives with his wife Jennifer and their two sons, and one daughter.

References

External links
Official page at the Nevada Legislature
Campaign site
 

1980 births
Living people
Candidates in the 2018 United States elections
Republican Party members of the Nevada Assembly
Ohio State University Moritz College of Law alumni
Nevada lawyers
People from Sonora, California
Politicians from Las Vegas
University of California, Berkeley alumni